This is a list of episodes of the 2007 Japanese television series Kamen Rider Den-O. Episode titles prefaced with a red line signify an episode centered on the story of Kamen Rider Den-O. Episode titles prefaced with a green line signify an episode centered on the story of Kamen Rider Zeronos.

Episodes 



References

See also

Den-O